Unwind with ITV is an ITV ambient television programme. It broadcasts time-lapse footage of either various peaceful environments or computer graphics, over soft ambient music or ASMR sound. Its introduction was, partially, a part of ITV's Britain Get Talking campaign, and is produced by Plymouth-based Rock Oyster Media in collaboration with mental health charity Campaign Against Living Miserably, with music coming from the libraries of the music conglomerate BMG. It started broadcasting on 2 October 2021. Since November 2022, Unwind was discontinued on STV, with it being replaced by Night Vision, which features news, sport and weather from across Scotland.

Since mid-November 2022, a round-the-clock feed of Unwind footage has been available as part of the lineup of FAST channels offered within the 'Live TV' section of ITVX.

Origins 
Unwind with ITV replaced an earlier programme called ITV Nightscreen, which was an hour-and-half filler programme of promotional information about upcoming ITV shows that ran over the late hours of ITV's night-time service. The programme was used to fill the station's overnight downtime, where a closedown would have once been used at the end of programmes. However under ITV's public service broadcasting requirements, the channel is required to operate a 24-hour-a-day service. ITV classified ITV Nightscreen as a regional programme. In 2017, the programme was said to account for more than a third of ITV's regional programming hours. Ofcom considered this an inappropriate means of fulfilling regional quotas and took action to remove the loophole.

Content 
The programme consists mainly of either ambient time-lapsed aerial, landscape or nature photography, done by either drone or static cameras. This is laid over soft music with occasional pieces of non-sensical poetry. If not, it broadcasts random computer generated graphics, which are sensitive to the noise of music or ASMR sounds being played over.

See also 
 The Landscape Channel  - A British defunct television channel that showed landscapes over ambient music

References

External links 
 
 
 Unwind with ITV on Rocky Oyster Media

2021 British television series debuts
Interstitial television shows
ITV (TV network) original programming